Ali Miharbi (born in İstanbul in 1976) is a kinetic and new media artist from Turkey. He graduated from Northwestern University in the US, majoring in Electrical and Computer Engineering and Art Theory & Practice in 2000. In 2010, he completed his MFA in Kinetic Imaging at Virginia Commonwealth University. His work not only makes relationships about culture and technology visible, but also explores the modes of emotional and physical confinement that persist in the contemporary world. He creates graphic as well as sculptural work, including sound installations and dynamic systems driven by live or stored data and has been featured in exhibitions internationally, including in Turkey, USA, Mexico, South Korea, Australia, Brazil, Germany, Netherlands, Greece, and UK.

References

External links 
 Ali Miharbi's Personal Site
 "Contemporary Art" Interview Series, 2010

Turkish contemporary artists
Digital artists
Living people
1976 births